Biogenesis of lysosome-related organelles complex 1 subunit 1 is a protein that in humans is encoded by the BLOC1S1 gene.

BLOC1S1 is a component of the ubiquitously expressed BLOC1 multisubunit protein complex. BLOC1 is required for normal biogenesis of specialized organelles of the endosomal-lysosomal system, such as melanosomes and platelet dense granules (Starcevic and Dell'Angelica, 2004).[supplied by OMIM]

Interactions
BLOC1S1 has been shown to interact with BLOC1S2, SNAPAP and PLDN.

References

External links

Further reading